Igor Volke (born 19 January 1950 in Jõgeva, Estonia) is an Estonian ufologist and researcher of environmental anomalies.

In 1985 he founded the organization AKRAK (Anomaalsete Keskkonnanähtuste Registreerimise ja Analüüsi Komisjon) for the purpose of collecting reports of anomalous environmental phenomena, particularly UFO reports, throughout Estonia. For a while, it operated in the Tallinn House of Engineers. AKRAK became inactive and was later replaced by EUFON (Estonian UFO Network).

Volke graduated from Tallinn School No. 21 in 1968, and Tallinn University of Technology in 1972. He worked in the Tallinn fire department from 1970–2000, and since 2000 worked at the National Library of Estonia as an occupational safety specialist. He is married and has three children.

Works
 
 
 

The book Ufopäevikud (UFO Diaries) consists mostly of UFO reports from around the world, starting with the 1940s, with special sections at the end for reports from Estonia and Finland.

References

1950 births
Estonian non-fiction writers
Living people
Ufologists
People from Jõgeva